The Way is a 2D cinematic platform game released for Microsoft Windows in 2016 and Nintendo Switch in 2019.  It was developed by Puzzling Dream and published by PlayWay. It tells the story of a space explorer who is unable to accept the death of his wife. Finding ancient writings on eternal existence during one of his last expeditions, he returns to the site in search of a way to bring her back to life.

Gameplay
The player controls the character in a 2D platform game. There are both action-based challenges and puzzles to be solved.

Development
In May 2014, developers started a Kickstarter campaign to fund the game. The campaign reached its goal with 1,566 backers, pledging over CA$20,000. Versions were planned for iOS, Android, OUYA, PlayStation, and Xbox, but in 2016 it was only released for Windows. A Switch version followed three years later, in May 2019, for the Nintendo eShop.

Reception
The Windows version has a 67 out of 100 score ("mixed or average") at Metacritic based on 14 critic reviews.

References

2016 video games
Cinematic platform games
Indie video games
Nintendo Switch games
Platform games
PlayWay games
Single-player video games
Video games developed in Poland
Windows games